Gnorimoschema radkevichi is a moth in the family Gelechiidae. It was described by Piskunov in 1980. It is found in Korea and Mongolia.

References

Gnorimoschema
Moths described in 1980